Neominois is a genus of butterflies from the subfamily Satyrinae in the family Nymphalidae.

Species
Neominois carmen A. Warren, Austin, Llorente, Luis & Vargas, 2008 – Joboni satyr
Neominois ridingsii (Edwards, 1865) – Ridings' satyr

External links 
 "Neominois Scudder, 1875" at Markku Savela's Lepidoptera and Some Other Life Forms

Satyrini
Butterfly genera
Taxa named by Samuel Hubbard Scudder